The Sporting Times (founded 1865, ceased publication 1932) was a weekly British newspaper devoted chiefly to sport, and in particular to horse racing. It was informally known as The Pink 'Un, as it was printed on salmon-coloured paper.

History
The paper was founded in 1865 by John Corlett, of Charlton Court, East Sutton, Kent, who was both its editor and its proprietor, and by Dr Joseph Henry Shorthouse. Corlett also wrote a column in the paper called 'Our Note Book' and was associated with it from 1865 to 1913. The Sporting Times was published on a Saturday, and its competitors included The Field, The Sportsman, the Sporting Life, and Bell's Life in London. According to Alexander Andrews's Chapters in the History of British Journalism, the paper thrived "less upon its racing news than upon its profusion of coarse and scurrilous scraps of tittle-tattle, representing 'society journalism' in its most degraded form".

In the 1870s the chess column of The Sporting Times was written by John Wisker (1846–1884), winner of the 1870 British Chess Championship.

On 14 September 1889 the magazine Vanity Fair carried one of its caricatures, printed in colour, of The Sporting Times editor John Corlett, subtitled The Pink 'Un.

In Sir Arthur Conan Doyle's story "The Adventure of the Blue Carbuncle", first published in the Strand Magazine in January 1892, Sherlock Holmes deduces that a man is keen on gambling by noticing that he has a copy of the paper, commenting - "When you see a man with whiskers of that cut and the 'Pink 'un' protruding out of his pocket, you can always draw him by a bet".

In 1922, under the heading "The Scandal of Ulysses", the paper reviewed the complete edition of James Joyce's novel Ulysses just published in Paris, its columnist "Aramis" writing trenchantly:

In Old Pink 'Un Days (1924) the sporting journalist J. B. Booth wrote about his work with the newspaper and its development, with anecdotes of the turf, the theatre, and boxing, and with frank accounts of some of the colourful characters of the worlds of sport and Fleet Street during the early twentieth century. He followed this up with A Pink 'Un Remembers (1937) and Sporting Times: The Pink 'Un World (1938).

The paper is mentioned in the novel Burmese Days by George Orwell:

In P.G. Wodehouse's short story "Bingo and the Little Woman" Bertie Wooster reveals that, "bar a weekly wrestle with the Pink 'Un and an occasional dip into the form-book, I’m not much of a lad for reading".

The paper ceased publication in 1932.

Rudyard Kipling mentions The Sporting Times as The Pink 'Un in his autobiography Something of Myself (1937).

Origin of the Ashes

On 29 August 1882, at the Oval, the England cricket team was beaten for the first time in a home Test match by Australia, and on 2 September The Sporting Times newspaper published a famous satirical death notice of English cricket, written by Reginald Shirley Brooks:

This notice followed a similar one which had appeared two days before in C. W. Alcock's Cricket: a Weekly Record of The Game, reading in full:  However, The Sporting Times was the first to refer to cremation and 'the ashes'.

The England cricket team toured Australia during the winter of 1882, and after it had won two out of three Tests its captain was presented with an urn containing the ashes of a cricket bail. Since then, The Ashes is the notional trophy England and Australia play for in Test match cricket. The urn is kept in the Lord's Cricket Ground museum. Due to its age and fragile condition, the original Ashes urn is not presented to the winning team; instead a Waterford Crystal trophy (first presented in 1999) and replica urns are presented.

The Sporting Times' mock-obituary has been caricatured many times, notably by Australia's Daily Telegraph in describing Australia’s series loss to South Africa at the MCG in 2008:
RIP, Australian Cricket, slaughtered by South Africa, 30 December at the MCG, aided and abetted by incompetent selectors, inept batting, impotent bowling, dreadful catching, poor captaincy".

See also
Horseracing in the United Kingdom

Bibliography
Booth, J. B., Old Pink 'Un Days (London, Grant Richards Ltd., 1924, illustrated, including a drawing by Philip May and a caricature by Ralph Rowland
Booth, J. B., A Pink 'Un Remembers (London, T. Werner Laurie Ltd., 1937, xx + 286 pp., with foreword by C. B. Cochran)
Booth, J. B., Sporting Times: The Pink 'Un World (London, T. Werner Laurie Ltd., 1938, xx + 284 pp., with foreword by Hugh Lowther, 5th Earl of Lonsdale KG)

References

Defunct newspapers published in the United Kingdom
Horse racing mass media in the United Kingdom
Publications established in 1865
Publications disestablished in 1932
Sports newspapers published in the United Kingdom
Weekly newspapers published in the United Kingdom
1932 establishments in the United Kingdom